The faculty of Missouri University of Science and Technology include professors, coaches, chancellors, and other staff associated with the Missouri University of Science and Technology, as well as faculty employed under its former names, the University of Missouri–Rolla and the Missouri School of Mines and Metallurgy.

Professors and teaching staff

Coaches and athletic staff

Chancellors and administrators

See also
 List of Missouri University of Science and Technology alumni

References

Missouri University of Science and Technology
Missouri University of Science and Technology faculty